Hothousing is a form of education for children, involving intense study of a topic in order to stimulate the child's mind. The goal is to take normal or bright children and boost them to a level of intellectual functioning above the norm. Advocates of the practice claim that it is essential for the brightest to flourish intellectually, while critics claim that it does more harm than good and can lead a child to abandon the area studied under such a scheme later in life.

Development 
It was Irving Sigel who first introduced the term "hothousing" in 1987 after the greenhouse farming method. It was an analogy with the way vegetables are forced to ripen in this condition. Sigel, who worked for the Educational Testing Service in Princeton, used it to refer to a child who is drilled in academic fields such as reading and math long before other children begin learning them in school. The child is likened to a "hurried student" induced to acquire knowledge with emphasis on how it fits into a broader scheme of knowledge instead of acquiring bits of information. Some scholars have criticized hothousing, labeling it as early maturity of learning.

Famous people who underwent hothousing
Charles S. Peirce
Gordon Brown
John Stuart Mill
Aubrey de Grey
Val McDermid
Ruth Lawrence

References

External links
Hothousing Young Children: Implications for Early Childhood Policy and Practice by Tynette W. Hills, published by ERIC Educational Reports - article urging parents to be cautious about hothousing
Child prodigies 'damaged for life by hothousing' - article by  Judith Judd from Independent (London)

Education by method
Pedagogy